The Battle of Port-au-Prince, or "la débâcle", took place on January 15, 1920 when Haitian rebels, known as cacos, attacked the capital of Haiti during the Second Caco War and the American occupation of Haiti.

At 4:00 a.m., "more than 300" caco rebels, many wearing the stolen uniform of the Haitian gendarmes, commanded by Benoît Batraville, attacked the city. The rebels moved into Port-au-Prince in columns, "with flags and conch horns blowing," only to be gunned down by Browning Automatic Rifle and machine gun fire. It turns out that the city's garrison of American Marines and Haitian gendarmes were ready for the assault, since a citizen who heard the rebels coming informed the former. The cacos were forced to break ranks and seek shelter in buildings, where they proceeded to snipe from windows and from around corners. One caco group attacked the city's slums and set a block on fire, which lit up "the entire surrounding countryside."

One of the defenders' patrols, a detachment of ten U.S. marines led by Lieutenant Gerald Thomas, met a caco force on the waterfront that was headed for the National Bank. Near the Iron Market, "a large number" of rebels was spotted coming down the street. Lieutenant Gerald Thomas loaded his detachment of marines into a truck to engage the incoming force of caco insurgents. The truck carrying the American marines moved past the arcades and iron-grilled buildings of the city's central marketplace. After seeing the flashes of rifles up the street. Lieutenant Gerald Thomas ordered his marines off the truck and into the arcade on the right side of the street. The marine patrol jogged by bounds from pillar to pillar. Lieutenant Gerald Thomas spotted the head of a column of cacos emerge from a side street and ordered his marines who were hidden by the darkness of the arcade into a hasty ambush. When the haitian caco rebels closed to fifty yards or less, Thomas and his fellow marines executed their ambush and opened fire with eight springfield rifles and two BARs decimating the column of caco rebels and conflicting heavy casualties. The surviving Cacos broke off the action within ten minutes and fled the city. However, Lieutenant Gerald Thomas saw that seven of his fellow American marines in return were hit, two seriously wounded. Lieutenant Gerald Thomas sent the two seriously wounded back to headquarters in the truck and led the remaining seven Marines to a sugar company compound. One of the seriously wounded who later died of his injuries was Private Lencil Combs. 

"Fully a fifth" of the caco attackers were killed, according to one estimate. Another source puts the number of rebel dead at 66, plus "many more" wounded and captured. One of the dead was Solomon Janvier, a Port-au-Prince resident and one of the leaders of the attack. The surviving cacos would remember the battle as "la débâcle." With the arrival of daylight, "patrols moved east and north of the city," killing "more than fifty" additional rebels.

References

Republic of Haiti (1859–1957)
Port-au-Prince (1920)
Port-au-Prince (1920)
Port-au-Prince (1920)
Port-au-Prince 1920
1920 in Haiti
Port-au-Prince 1920
January 1920 events
20th century in Port-au-Prince
History of Port-au-Prince